Poppo of Passau was Bishop of Passau from 1204 to 1206.

Poppo, before taking over his office, was Dompropst of Aquileia Cathedral.

References

Year of birth unknown
Year of death unknown
Roman Catholic bishops of Passau
13th-century Roman Catholic bishops in Bavaria